Professor Chingiz Muzafar oglu Khalifa-zade (Azerbaijani: Xəlifəzadə Çingiz Müzəfər oğlu, born 17 February 1931 in Nukha, Soviet Union) is Azerbaijani and Soviet geologist and Professor of Geology and Mineralogy and Petrology; and Head of Department at Azerbaijan State Oil Academy; and President of the Sedimentological Society of Azerbaijan; and Academician at the International Eco-Energy Academy,; and Honorary foreign member of the Russian Academy of Natural Sciences.

Khalifa-zade is married and has a son, three grandchildren and one great granddaughter.

Career
In 1952, Khalifa-zade graduated from Baku State University (Department of Geology). In 1955, he prepared PhD thesis related the Mineralogy and Middle Jurassic Argullicies of the South-East Caucasus and received Candidate of Science degree (Ph.D). Later, he held positions as Senior Scientist, Head of Division and Acting Head of the Institute of Geology, Makhachkala, Dagestan, Russian Federation, USSR.

In 1972, Khalifa-zade obtained Doctor of Science degree on Geology and Mineralogy from the Institute of Geology (now GIN RAS), Moscow, Soviet (Russian) Academy of Science., In 1975, he received the rank of Professor of Geology and Mineral Deposits at Baku State University. In 1980-1981, he headed the Baku-based United Nation courses and training programs on Geology for professionals from Turkey, Nigeria, Vietnam, Bulgaria, Tanzania, Nepal, Burma, Yemen, Bangladesh, Egypt and other developing countries. He also was a scientific adviser for the Saatli Superdeep well (Saatli, Azerbaijan).

In 1980, he was awarded a title of Honorable Geologist of Azerbaijan SSR. In 2000, he received Azerbaijan's Medal of Progress awarded by the President of Azerbaijan H.E. Heydar Aliyev in occasion with 80th Anniversary of Azerbaijan State Oil Academy.

Since 1981, Khalifa-zade is Full Professor and Head of Department of Mineralogy and Petrology at Azerbaijan State Oil Academy. He also is a member of the American Association of Petroleum Geologists (AAPG), Houston (USA and President of the Sedimentological Society of Azerbaijan.

Since 2008, Khalifa-zade is an honorary foreign member of the Russian Academy of Natural Sciences.

Khalifa-zade is a member of Editorial Board of the International Journal of Stratigraphy And Sedimentology Of Oil-Gas Basins, Baku, Azerbaijan National Academy of Science

Activities
In 1978, Khalifa-zade lectured at the University of London and Imperial College, United Kingdom. In 1992, he lectured at the Middle East Technical University (METU), Ankara, Turkey; and within 1991-1992, he was a visiting professor at University of Cairo and University of Alexandria, Egypt.

He was a member of Soviet and Azerbaijani delegations at DC, XI, XII, XIV and XVII International Congresses on Sedimentology (France, 1975, Canada 1982, Australia 1986, Bulgaria 1989 and Romania 1998) and chaired the Section on Sedimentology and Geochemistry.

Publications
Khalifa-zade authored more than 270 articles, 4 text-books and 5 monographs (in Azerbaijani, English and Russian). He also authored Sideritovye zalezhi Dagestana (Siderit Deposits of Dagestan), book, in-Russian, Moscow, Nauka Publishing house, 1963; co-authored Srednei︠u︡rskie otlozhenii︠a︡ vostochnoĭ chasti Bolʹshogo Kavkaza (Middle Jurassic Deposits of the Eastern Part of the Greater Caucasus), book, in-Russian, Moscow, Nauka Publishing house, 1982 and co-authored Mineralogii︠a︡ i genezis boksitovykh porod Nakhichevanskoĭ ASSR (Mineralogy and Geneses of the Boksit Deposits of Nakhcivan ASSR), book, in-Russian, 1986, Elm publishing-house, Baku, Azerbaijan.

Text-books

1- Khalifa-zade Ch.M, The Course of Lithology and Fascia, in-Azerbaijani, Maarif publishing house, Baku, Azerbaijan SSR, 1982, pages 259

2- Khalifa-zade Ch.M., Secrets of the Moon, in-Azerbaijani, Azernesr publishing house, Baku, Azerbaijan SSR, 1979, pages 77

Patents

1- Khalifa-zade and others, A Method to Estimate the Speed of Sedimentation in Sedimental Rocks, Moscow, The State Committee of Inventions and Discovers of the USSR (USSR Patent), Moscow, USSR, April 15, 1986, http://patentdb.su/patents/khalifazade

Articles

1- Khalifa-Zade, Ch. M., Gyrbanof, V., Mamedof. E.A., Sediek, K. N., Petrographical and petrophysical studies of Middle Triassic bearing oil rocks at Gebel Mangishlak, North Kazakhstan area. Oil and gas Journal, 1990, V.3, p. 1-11

2- Sediek, K.N, Khalifa-Zade, Ch.M, Catagenesis model of fragmental and carbonate collectors of Triassic and Upper Paleozoic rocks, at Gebel Mangishlak, North Kazakhstan area. Oil and gas Journal, 1990, V.3., p. 12-17

3- Khalifa-zade, Ch.M., and E.Q. Abbasov, The alteration of clay minerals in large depth, Azerbaijan Geologist, 1999, V. 1, p. 15-28

4- Khalifa-Zade Ch.M., Rustamova R.E. The new data on the paleogeographic model of productive series basin on the base dissemination of turbidity sandy system within the South Caspian depression, Azerbaijan National Academy of Sciences proceedings, The Science of Earth, 2001, №1. p. 84-88

5- Chingiz Khalifazade, The New Data on the Paleotemperature of Pliocene Basins within the South Caspian Depression, Azerbaijan State Oil Academy, Turkey, 2003, Turkiye jeoloji kurultayi; Bildiri Ozleri Kitabi 63rd, 214, MTA Genel Mudurlugu Kultur Sitesi, Ankara, and http://www.jmo.org.tr/resimler/ekler/04e6f2de036648c_ek.pdf

6- Ch.M.Khalifa-zade, On the Distribution of the Turbidite Type Reservoirs in Productive Series within the South Caspian Deepwater Structures, Azerbaijan State Oil Academy, AAPG HEDBERG RESEARCH CONFERENCE, May 18–21, 2004 — Baku, Azerbaijan, http://www.searchanddiscovery.com/documents/abstracts/2004hedberg_baku/short/khalifa_zade.htm

7- Ch.Khalifazade, V.A.Mursalov and R.A.Huseynov, Paleogeography and Types of Pliocene Basins within the South Caspian Trough, Caspian & Black Sea Geosciences Conference, 6 October 2008, http://www.earthdoc.org/publication/publicationdetails/?publication=15925

8- E.Abdullayev, W.Ehrmann, C.Khalifazade and E.Huseynov, Distribution of Clay Mineral Assemblages in Lower Pliocene Sediments, Western Flank of the South Caspian Sea, 74th EAGE Conference & Exhibition, http://www.earthdoc.org/publication/publicationdetails/?publication=59799

9- E.Abdullayev (University of Leipzig), W.Ehrmann (University of Leipzig), C.Khalifazade (Azerbaijan State Oil Academy) & E.Huseynov (ANAS), Characterization of Clay Mineral Assemblages in Pliosene Sequences from the Western Flank of the South Caspian Basin, 74th EAGE Conference & Exhibition incorporating SPE EUROPEC 2012,  Copenhagen, Denmark, 4–7 June 2012, http://www.uni-leipzig.de/~geologie/Mitarbeiter/Abdullayev/Abdullayev.pdf

References

External links 
Çingiz Xəlifəzadə/Şəki Ensiklopediyası (Encyclopedia of Shaki).

 Prof Chingiz Khalifa-zade, Azerbaijan State Oil Academy.
 VIAF ID: 6294260 (Personal).
 WorldCat Identities.
 Khalifa-zade Chingiz Muzafar oglu, in-Azerbaijani, Azerbaijani Soviet Encyclopedia, 1987, Vol X, page 77. 
 The 80th anniversary of Professor Chingiz Khalifa-zade's birthday and the 55th anniversary of his professional activity. Prominent Soviet and Azerbaijani scientist and geologist who carries researches in Sedimentology. Journal of Litology and Natural Deposits, in-Russian, Moscow, Nauka Publishing house, Russian Academy of Science, Russia, July–August 2011, page 443-444.

1931 births
Living people
Academic staff of Azerbaijan State Oil and Industry University